Mario Humberto De Luna Saucedo (born 5 January 1988) is a Mexican professional footballer who plays as a centre-back for UAT.

Club career

C.D. Guadalajara 
A product of Chivas youth team, CD Tapatio, de Luna made his professional debut on November 9, 2008, against Puebla F.C. in the 2008 Apertura. At the 2009 Interliga de Luna replaced the injured Jonny Magallón performing brilliantly in the tournament, although he suffered an injury in the final. On September 6, 2009, he scored his first goal in the Primera División de México helping Chivas to a 2–2 draw against Puebla.

CD Chivas USA 
On February 21, 2013, sister club Chivas USA announced they had acquired Mario de Luna and teammates Giovani Casillas and Edgar Mejia on loan from CD Guadalajara.

After pushing and verbally abusing a ball boy during a game against the Portland Timbers on May 12, 2013, de Luna earned a yellow card for "Foul and abusive language" directed towards a child.

Honours
Necaxa
Copa MX: Clausura 2018

References

External links

1988 births
Living people
Footballers from Aguascalientes
People from Aguascalientes City
Association football defenders
Mexican footballers
C.D. Guadalajara footballers
Chivas USA players
Club Puebla players
Club Necaxa footballers
Liga MX players
Major League Soccer players
Mexican expatriate footballers
Expatriate soccer players in the United States
Mexican expatriate sportspeople in the United States